George Hubert Lockhart (January 25, 1899 – May 23, 1968), sometimes listed as "Joe", was an American Negro league pitcher in the 1920s.

A native of Flowery Branch, Georgia, Lockhart attended Talladega College. In 1923, he pitched for collegiate no-hitters.

He made his Negro leagues debut in 1923 with the Bacharach Giants. He played six seasons for the club, and made appearances in the 1926 and 1927 Colored World Series. Lockhart finished his career in 1929 with the Chicago American Giants. 

Lockhart was a physical education teacher and coached multiple sports at Alabama State College for more than 40 years. He died in Montgomery, Alabama in 1968.

He was inducted into the Alabama High School Athletic Association Hall of Fame in 2003.

References

External links
 and Seamheads

1899 births
1968 deaths
Bacharach Giants players
Chicago American Giants players
Baseball pitchers
Baseball players from Georgia (U.S. state)
People from Hall County, Georgia
20th-century African-American sportspeople
Talladega College alumni